Coxhead is a surname. Notable people with the surname include:

Craig Coxhead, New Zealand judge
Ernest Coxhead (1863–1933), English architect
Maurice Coxhead (1889–1917), English cricketer
Michael Coxhead, British businessman